= DNA recombination =

DNA recombination may refer to:

- Genetic recombination, a natural aspect of DNA repair mechanisms
- Homologous recombination, one common form of recombination in eukaryotes
- Recombinant DNA technology, in which genetic changes are induced in the laboratory using features of the above mechanisms
